The Baker–Venkataraman rearrangement is the chemical reaction of 2-acetoxyacetophenones with base to form 1,3-diketones.

This rearrangement reaction proceeds via enolate formation followed by acyl transfer. It is named after the scientists Wilson Baker and K. Venkataraman.

The Baker–Venkataraman rearrangement is often used in the synthesis of chromones and flavones. After the base-catalyzed rearrangement, treatment with acid generally affords the chromone or flavone core, though other milder methods have been reported.

Mechanism 
A base abstracts the hydrogen atom alpha to the aromatic ketone, forming an enolate. Then, the enolate attacks the ester carbonyl to form a cyclic alkoxide. The cyclic intermediate is opened up to form a more stable phenolate, which is protonated during acidic work-up to give the desired product.

To complete the construction of the chromone or flavone core, cyclodehydration is required. This was commonly afforded by treatment with strong acid, however many milder conditions have now been developed. One proposed mechanism for this dehydration is as follows:

See also
 Allan–Robinson reaction
 Kostanecki acylation

References

External links
https://www.organic-chemistry.org/namedreactions/baker-venkataraman-rearrangement.shtm

Rearrangement reactions
Name reactions